Sergey Grigorievich Migitsko (born April 23, 1953) is a Soviet and Russian film and theater actor, TV presenter, Honored Artist of the RSFSR (1991), People's Artist of Russia (1998).

Selected filmography
 1974 —  Dear Boy as  Bill
 1974 —  The Straw Hat  as Boben
 1976 —  Sentimental Romance  as Syomka Gorodnitsky
 1977 —  Incognito from St. Petersburg  as Khlestakov
 1991 —  Viva Gardes-Marines!  as Jacques-Joachim Trotti, marquis de La Chétardie
 1992 —  The Chekist as Captain Klimenko's relative  
 1997 —  To whom will God send as Arkady
 1999 —  Streets of Broken Lights as Strizhinsky
 2005 —  Doktor Zhivago as Gordon
 2006 —  Travesty as Savsky
 2006 —  Andersen. Life Without Love as Hans Christian Andersen / Christian X of Denmark
 2011 —  Secrets of Investigation   as master
 2013 —  Chagall — Malevich as Israel Vishnyak
 2013 —  Sherlock Holmes  as Philip McIntyre

References

External links 
 
 Оfficial Site
 Biography Sergey Migitsko on peoples.ru

1953 births
Living people
Actors from Odesa
Soviet male film actors
Soviet male television actors
Soviet male stage actors
Russian male film actors
Russian male stage actors
Russian male television actors
20th-century Russian male actors
21st-century Russian male actors
Russian State Institute of Performing Arts alumni
Honored Artists of the RSFSR
People's Artists of Russia